Nicholas Mitchell may refer to:

Nick Mitchell (born 1982), American mixed martial artist and retired professional wrestler
Nick Douglas (born 1967), née Nicholas Mitchell, American musician
Nicholas Mitchell (presenter), British expert at the Antiques Roadshow, Series 27

See also
Nicholas Michel (fl. 1353), merchant and MP and mayor for Coventry